The 2019 London Spitfire season was the second season of the London Spitfire's existence in the Overwatch League. The Spitfire entered the season as the defending Overwatch League champions after winning the 2018 Grand Finals.

Following a 0–3 loss to the Seoul Dynasty in Week 5 of Stage 1, the Spitfire fell to 3–4 and missed out on the Stage 1 Playoffs. London found success in Stage 2, as the team posted a 6–1 record and qualified for the Stage 2 Playoffs; however, they were knocked out in the quarterfinals by the Hangzhou Spark after losing 1–3. The Spitfire parted ways with head coach Kwang-bok "Coach815" Kim in the middle of Stage 3, leaving the team without a head coach. A 0–4 loss to the Los Angeles Valiant in Stage 3 eliminated London from Stage 3 playoff contention as the team went on to post a 3–4 record for that stage. After a 4–3 win–loss record in Stage 4, London finished the regular season with a 16–12 record and qualified for the Play-In Tournament for a chance to make it to the season playoffs.

London took down the Shanghai Dragons 4–3 in an OWL record eight-map series to qualify for the season playoffs. In the first round, London was defeated by the New York Excelsior, 1–4, sending the team to the lower bracket. A 0–4 loss to the San Francisco Shock ended the Spitfire's playoff run.

Preceding offseason

Player re-signings 
From 1 August to 9 September 2018, all Overwatch League teams that competed in the 2018 season could choose to extend their team's players' contracts. London was the only team to re-sign all of their players; during this time, the team also signed their new head coach, Kim "Coach815" Kwang-bok.

Free agency 
All non-expansion teams could not enter the free agency period until 8 October; they were able to sign members from their respective academy team and make trades until then. On 15 October, Spitfire transferred Wonsik "Closer" Jung to Dallas Fuel. A day later, London made their first free agency acquisition, signing former Element Mystic and DPS player Hee "Guard" Lee-dong. The next day, Spitfire signed Jeong "Krillin" Yung-hoon, a relatively unknown player who had most recently played in the Overwatch Open Division.

Regular season 

London opened their season on 14 February against the Philadelphia Fusion – a rematch of the 2018 Overwatch League Grand Finals. The team went on to lose the match by a score of 1–3. The Spitfire finished Stage 1 with a 3–4 record, failing to advance to the Stage playoffs.

In the middle of Stage 2, London signed support player Song "Quatermain" Ji-hoon, who had previously played for Cloud9 Kongdoo. London traveled to the Allen Event Center in Allen, Texas for the Dallas Fuel Homestand Weekend in week four of Stage 2. The team first took on the Paris Eternal on 20 April; after an hour-long power outage delayed the match, London swept the Eternal 4–0, improving their undefeated stage record to 5–0. The Spitfire's second match of the weekend was against the Chengdu Hunters a day later. The Spitfire were handed their first loss of Stage 2, losing the match by a 1–3 scoreline. London finished Stage 2 with a 6–1 record, giving them the second seed Stage 2 Playoffs. London faced the seventh-seeded Hangzhou Spark in the Stage 2 Quarterfinals on 9 May; the Spitfire lost the match 1–3.

In 24 July, in the middle of Stage 3, the Spitfire parted ways with head coach Kwang-bok "Coach815" Kim, leaving the team without a head coach. The team finished Stage 3 with a 3–4 record.

The Spitfire's first match of Stage 4, along with the first match with an enforced 2-2-2 role lock by the League, was against the Dallas Fuel on 26 July; the team went on to a 3–1 win.

Postseason

Play-In Tournament 
Finishing in seventh place in the regular season standings, the Spitfire qualified for the Play-In Tournament for the chance to qualify for the season playoffs. The team had a first-round bye in the tournament and faced the Shanghai Dragons on 31 August. The Spitfire looked dominant in the first two maps, completely shutting down the Dragons, to jump to an early 2–0 lead. However, the Dragon's DPS duo Yang "DDing" Jin-hyeok on Pharah and Jin "YoungJIN" Yong-jin on Doomfist came alive thereafter, helping Shanghai to claim the third map, Hanamura; with a tie on map six, King's Row, the team eventually tie the series 3–3 after seven maps. London sent the match to Ilios for the final map of the series. Both teams managed to take a point in the map, but London's coordination won out in the end, as they won 4–3 loss in an Overwatch League record 8-map series to qualify for the season playoffs.

Playoffs 
With the win in the Play-In Tournament, the Spitfire qualified as the seventh seed in the season playoffs. London began their playoff run with a match against the second-seeded New York Excelsior on 6 September. New York took the first map, Busan, to take a quick 1–0 lead in the series. For the second map, London selected Numbani. Both teams were able to complete the map on their respective attacks, but New York came out on top in overtime rounds to take a two-map lead. After a match break, the Spitfire selected Temple of Anubis for map three; again, both teams were able to complete the map on their first attacks. While London was able to take the first point on their second attack, New York's but up a solid defensive performance and prevented the Spitfire from completing the map a second time, leading to a third map win for the Excelsior. For map four, the match went to Watchpoint: Gibraltar. London took a win on the map to close the gap to 3–1. However, New York won in two rounds on Ilios to win the match. The 1–4 loss sent the Spitfire to the lower bracket.

For the first round of the lower bracket, London took on the third-seeded San Francisco Shock the following day. Despite London DPS Park "Profit" Joon-yeong putting on a stellar performance on Pharah throughout the match, the Shock were able to overcome everything London threw at them. Shock DPS Kwon "Striker" Nam-joo and main support Grant "Moth" Espe performed extremely well throughout the match to help the Shock rebound from their previous match, as the handed London a 0–4 sweep, ending their playoff run.

Final roster

Transactions 
Transactions of/for players on the roster during the 2019 regular season:
On 26 April, Spitfire signed Song "Quatermain" Ji-hoon.

Standings

Record by stage

League

Game log

Regular season

Playoffs

Awards 
On 8 May, Kim "Fury" Jun-Ho, Hong "Gesture" Jae-Hui, and Park "Profit" Jun-Young were named as a reserves for the 2019 Overwatch League All-Star Game.

References 

2019 Overwatch League seasons by team
London Spitfire
London Spitfire seasons